King's Farm or Kings Farm is a ghost town in Cass County, Texas,  from the city of Linden and  from Atlanta. The town was abandoned in 1936.

References

Geography of Cass County, Texas
Unincorporated communities in Cass County, Texas
Unincorporated communities in Texas
1936 disestablishments in Texas